Rjoandefossen is a waterfall in Aurland Municipality in Vestland county, Norway. The waterfall is visible from the Flåm Line railway.

References

External links

Tourist attractions in Vestland
Aurland
Waterfalls of Vestland